Acuariidae is a family of spirurian nematodes. Like all nematodes, they have neither a circulatory nor a respiratory system. They are the only family in superfamily Acuarioidea, and number about 40 genera and 300 species, most of which are parasites of birds.

Genera
Several genera, particularly in the Seuratiinae, are monotypic. At least some of them are liable to be invalid.

Subfamily Acuariinae Railliet, Henry & Sisoff, 1912
 Acuaria Bremser, 1811
 Cheilospirura Diesing, 1861
 Chevreuxia Seurat, 1918
 Chordatortilis Mendonça & Rodrigues, 1965
 Chordocephalus Alegret, 1941
 Cosmocephalus Molin, 1858
 Decorataria Sobolev, 1949 (sometimes included in Syncuaria)
 Desportesius Chabaud & Campana, 1949
 Dispharynx Railliet, Henry & Sisoff, 1912 (sometimes included in Synhimantus)
 Echinuria Soloviev, 1912
 Paracuaria Krishna Rao, 1951
 Pectinospirura Wehr, 1933
 Sexansocara Sobolev & Sudarikov, 1939
 Skrjabinocerca Shikhoblaova, 1930
 Skrjabinoclava Sobolev, 1943
 Stammerinema Osche, 1955
 Syncuaria Gilbert, 1927 (sometimes included in Echinuria)
 Synhimantus Railliet, Henry & Sisoff, 1912
 Willmottia Mawson, 1982
 Xenocordon Mawson, 1982
Subfamily Schistorophinae Travassos, 1918
 Ancyracanthopsis Diesing, 1861
 Quasithelazia Maplestone, 1932 (sometimes included in Schistorophus)
 Schistorophus Railliet, 1916
 Sciadiocara Skrjabin, 1916
 Viktorocara Guschanskaja, 1950

Subfamily Seuratiinae Chitwood & Wehr, 1932
 Aviculariella Wehr, 1931
 Ingliseria Gibson, 1968
 Proyseria Petter, 1959
 Pseudohaplonema Wang et al., 1978
 Rusguniella Seurat, 1919
 Seuratia Skrjabin, 1916
 Stegophorus Wehr, 1934
 Streptocara Railliet, Henry & Sisoff, 1912
Incertae sedis
 Antechiniella Quentin & Beveridge, 1986
 Chandleronema Little & Ali, 1980
 Cyclopsinema Cobb, 1927
 Deliria Vicente, Magalhaes Pinto & Noronha, 1980
 Molinacuaria Wong & Lankester, 1985
 Pseudoaviculariella Gupta & Jehan, 1971
 Tikusnema Hasegawa, Shiraishi & Rochma, 1992
 Voguracuaria Wong & Anderson, 1993

Footnotes

References 
  (2007): Family Acuariidae. Version of 2007-AUG-07. Retrieved 2008-NOV-04.

Spirurida
Nematode families